Erkal is a Turkish surname, and it may refer to:

Genco Erkal (born 1938), Turkish drama actor
İbrahim Erkal (1966–2017), Turkish singer, songwriter, composer and actor
Nilay Erkal (born 1999), Turkish long-distance swimmer
Rebii Erkal (1911–1985),Turkish footballer and manager

Turkish-language surnames